The women's K-1 500 metres event was an individual kayaking event conducted as part of the Canoeing at the 1964 Summer Olympics programme on Lake Sagami, Japan.

The preliminary heats were held on 20 October 1964; 13 kayakers entered and were split into two heats of 7 and 6.  The top three placers in each heat advanced to the semifinal, while the remaining 7 competitors were relegated to the semifinal held the next day.  All 7 competed in the same semifinal, with the top 3 placers joining the 6 winners of the heats in the final. The final was held on 22 October.

Medalists

Results

Heats

The 13 competitors first raced in two heats on 20 October.  The top three finishers from each of the heats advanced directly to the final; the rest competed in the semifinal the next day.

Semifinal

The top three finishers in the semifinal (raced on 21 October) advanced to the final.  All other kayakers were eliminated.

Final

The final was held on 22 October.

References
1964 Summer Olympics official report Volume 2, Part 1. pp. 251–2.
Sports-reference.com 1964 women's K-1 500 m results.

Women's K-1 500
Olympic
Women's events at the 1964 Summer Olympics